Julia Margaret Wilcox is an American businessperson and politician from Alabama. Wilcox is a Republican member of Alabama House of Representatives for district 104.

Early life 
Wilcox was born and raised in Theodore, Alabama. In 1980, Wilcox graduated from Theodore High School.

Career 
In 1980, Wilcox became the CEO of Mobile Bay Transportation. Wilcox owns transportation companies in Mobile, Alabama, including Mobile Bay Transportation Company and Yellow Cab of Mobile.

Wilcox ran as a Republican in the special election on February 4, 2014, for the Alabama House of Representatives seat for District 104. Wilcox succeeded Jim Barton, who resigned in August 2013.

In 2016, Wilcox ran for the Mobile County Commission against Jerry Carl. Carl defeated Wilcox.

References

External links 
 Margie Wilcox at ballotpedia.org
 Margie Wilcox at ourcampaigns.com

Living people
Politicians from Mobile, Alabama
Year of birth missing (living people)
Republican Party members of the Alabama House of Representatives
21st-century American politicians
People from Theodore, Alabama